Hindle Wakes is a 1918 British silent film drama, directed by Maurice Elvey and starring Colette O'Niel and Hayford Hobbs.  It is the first of four screen versions of the celebrated and controversial 1912 play by Stanley Houghton. It which was a sensation in its time for its daring assertions that a woman could enjoy a sexual fling just as much as a man, without feeling any guilt or obligation to explain herself, and that she was perfectly capable of making her own life decisions without interference from family or the need to bow to social pressures.

Elvey was reported to be unsatisfied with the way the film turned out and, believing he could do better, directed a remake in 1927, producing what is now regarded as a classic of British silent cinema.

Cast
 Colette O'Niel as Fanny Hawthorne
 Hayford Hobbs as Alan Jeffcote
 Norman McKinnel as Nat Jeffcote
 Edward O'Neill as Chris Hawthorne
 Ada King as Mrs. Hawthorne
 Margaret Bannerman as Beatrice Farrar
 Frank Dane as Sir Timothy Farrar
 Dolly Tree as Mary Hollins

External links 
 
 Hindle Wakes at BFI Film & TV Database

1918 films
1918 drama films
Films directed by Maurice Elvey
British silent feature films
British black-and-white films
British films based on plays
British drama films
1910s English-language films
1910s British films
Silent drama films